The Downtown Halifax Link system is a network of climate-controlled pedways (pedestrian tunnels and skywalks) connecting various office buildings, hotels, parkades, and entertainment venues around downtown Halifax, Nova Scotia, Canada. It is similar to Toronto's PATH or Montreal's RÉSO system, but on a much smaller scale. These walkways are all open to the public, and are convenient during inclement weather and the winter months.

Connected buildings
Hotels:
The Prince George Hotel
The Hotel Halifax (formally Delta Halifax)
The Barrington Hotel (formally Delta Barrington)
Marriott Halifax Harbourfront (formerly Casino Nova Scotia hotel)

Office buildings:
TD Tower (Barrington Street)
Barrington Tower (Scotia Square)
Duke Tower (Scotia Square)
Cogswell Tower (Scotia Square)
CIBC Building (Barrington Street)
Brunswick Place formerly Trade Mart (Scotia Square)
World Trade and Convention Centre
Purdy's Wharf
Purdy's Landing
Purdy's Wharf Tower 1
Purdy's Wharf Tower 2

Residential:
Plaza 1881 (Brunswick Street)

Entertainment and retail:
Scotiabank Centre
Casino Nova Scotia
Scotia Square Mall
Granville Mall
Barrington Place Shops

Proposed connections
Trade Centre Limited (TCL), the developers of the new Halifax Convention Centre, have sought to connect the new facility with the Downtown Halifax Link via a new tunnel along Grafton Street. Scott Ferguson, president of TCL, said that such a tunnel would help Halifax compete by linking the new centre with the existing network of hotel rooms. The tunnel is expected to cost $7-10 million. City staff are exploring possible alternatives but have not ruled the tunnel out.

References

External links
Downtown Halifax Link website

Buildings and structures in Halifax, Nova Scotia
Pedways in Canada
Skyways
Underground cities